Rufino Pacific Tower or more commonly known as Rufino Tower or Rufino Plaza is an office skyscraper and is one of the tallest buildings in the Philippines and tallest buildings in Metro Manila. It remains as the tallest steel-framed building in the country. It has a total of 41 stories above ground level, including a 10 storey podium which is actually the original building, the old V.A. Rufino Building, and was modified to be the podium of the new tower. It is one of the few skyscrapers that utilizes car elevators.

Rufino Tower is designed with exterior double-glazed, unitized curtain walls that create a facade that reflects a fusion of art and function. Its interiors are an interplay of glass, natural stone and metal. The building is the home of the Rufino family corporations, including major financial and insurance corporations. The Czech Embassy is also housed in the tower.

Location
The building is located at 6784 Ayala Avenue corner V.A. Rufino Street (which was also named in honor of the Rufino family) in Makati. The stretch of Ayala Avenue, aptly nicknamed the Wall Street of the Philippines, where Rufino Pacific Tower lies also has branches of Metrobank, Bank of the Philippine Islands, Equitable PCI Bank (now BDO), Export and Industry Bank, International Exchange Bank (now UnionBank), and East West Bank.  The Tower hosts the city's first "green & boutique" business centre, Little Green Hub, for incubating start-up and early-stage companies in Makati. It also almost directly faces PBCom Tower, the tallest building in the Philippines then.  The building has a signature all glass design, similar to Pacific Plaza Towers, the one of the tallest buildings in Bonifacio Global City, which was also developed by the Rufino family.

References

External links
Rufino Pacific Tower at Emporis
Rufino Pacific Tower Information
Rufino Pacific Tower at Ayala Maps

Skyscraper office buildings in Metro Manila
Skyscrapers in Makati
Office buildings completed in 1994
1994 establishments in the Philippines